Missing Millions is a 1922 American silent drama film directed by Joseph Henabery and written by Jack Boyle and Albert S. Le Vino. The Boston Blackie film stars Alice Brady, David Powell, Frank Losee, Riley Hatch, John B. Cooke, William B. Mack, and George LeGuere. The film was released on September 17, 1922, by Paramount Pictures.

Cast 

Alice Brady as Mary Dawson
David Powell as Boston Blackie
Frank Losee as Jim Franklin
Riley Hatch as Detective John Webb
John B. Cooke as Handsome Harry Hawks
William B. Mack as Thomas Dawson
George LeGuere as Daniel Regan
Alice May as Mrs. Regan
H. Cooper Cliffe as Sir Arthur Cumberland
Sydney Deane as Donald Gordon
Beverly Travers as Claire Dupont
Sidney Herbert as Frank Garber

Preservation status
Missing Millions is considered to be a lost film.

References

External links

1922 films
1920s English-language films
Silent American drama films
1922 drama films
Paramount Pictures films
Films directed by Joseph Henabery
American black-and-white films
Lost American films
American silent feature films
Boston Blackie films
1922 lost films
Lost drama films
1920s American films